Alan Dean Lagimodiere is a Canadian provincial politician who served as the representative for the Legislative Assembly of Manitoba for Selkirk. Prior to his run for the Manitoba Legislature he was a hotelier and veterinarian. Soon after his election to a second term he was named the Minister of Indigenous Reconciliation and Northern Relations, though upon his appointment he was criticized for his vocal defense of the Canadian residential school system.

Early life 
Lagmodiere was born and raised in Northern Manitoba in the community of The Pas. He is Métis and a member of Manitoba's Metis Nation. Lagmodiere holds a Bachelor of Science degree in agriculture from the University of Manitoba, and later both a Master of Business Administration and a Doctorate in Veterinary Medicine from the University of Saskatchewan.

Business career
Lagmodiere began his career in Selkirk, Manitoba as a veterinarian and businessperson. He has been a member of the Canadian Veterinary Medical Association, the Manitoba Veterinary Medical Association, and the Manitoba Hotel Association through his co-ownership of a group of local hotels.

Electoral career
Lagmodiere who was elected as the Member of the Legislative Assembly of Manitoba for the riding of Selkirk in the 2016 election. He had previously run for the PC nomination in 2014 against fellow candidate David Horbas, whom he replaced at the last minute in the 2016 after Horbas was dismissed from running an additional time (Horbas claimed he was not informed of the decision mid-campaign). He is a member of the Progressive Conservative party, and defeated NDP incumbent and long-term MLA Greg Dewar in the election. He was re-elected in the 2019 provincial election. In 2021 Lagimodiere was appointed to the position of Minister of Indigenous Reconciliation and Northern Relations.

Defence of the Canadian residential school system
In the minutes following his appointment as the minister in charge of Indigenous Reconciliation and Northern Relations, Lagimodiere made comments defending the Canadian residential school system, and was criticized for his support of this tool of genocide. In a confrontation, Lagimodiere was corrected by NDP Leader Wab Kinew , who informed him that, "It was the express intent of residential schools to kill the Indian in the child—it is not cultural relativism, it is not revisionist history for us to say that that was wrong."

The leader of the Manitoba's Metis Nation, of which Lagimodiere is a member, later stated:

Lagimodiere later stated he felt his claim for the virtuousness of the residential schools was misunderstood and chose not to apologize for the fourteen minute introductory speech that he had provided on his views. In response, Chief Sheldon Kent of Black River First Nation stated that the minister's, "comments were harmful, retriggering anger and discontent among our people. There was no good intention at Indian residential schools to promote and it is catastrophically irresponsible to suggest otherwise," while calling for his resignation.

Personal life
Lagimodiere is married to his wife Judy Lagimodiere, with whom he has four children.

References

1957 births
Living people
People from The Pas
People from Selkirk, Manitoba
Progressive Conservative Party of Manitoba MLAs
Franco-Manitoban people
Métis politicians
University of Manitoba alumni
University of Saskatchewan alumni
Canadian hoteliers
Canadian veterinarians
21st-century Canadian politicians